Yevgeny Kafelnikov and Sargis Sargsian were the defending champions, but did not compete this year, with Kafelnikov retired at the end of the 2003 season.

Chris Haggard and Robbie Koenig won the title, defeating Travis Parrott and Dmitry Tursunov 7–6(7–3), 6–1 in the final. It was the 1st and only title in the year for the pair, and the 5th title for Haggard and 5th and final title for Koenig, in their respective careers.

Seeds

Draw

Draw

External links
 Main draw

Legg Mason Tennis Classic Doubles